KBAI (930 AM) is a radio station broadcasting a classic hits format. Licensed to Bellingham, Washington, the station serves the Whatcom County area. The station is owned by the Cascade Radio Group subsidiary of Saga Communications.

Former syndicated shows
 "The Stephanie Miller Show"
 "The Thom Hartman Show"
 "The Randi Rhodes Show"
 "The Ed Schultz Show"
 "The Alan Colmes Show"
 "The Bill Press Show"
 "Leslie Marshall"
 "Ring of Fire"
 "Free Talk Live"

History
The station call letters became KIXT in 1999, when SAGA Communications Inc. purchased 930 AM from Bellingham Broadcasting Corporation. In 2001, the station call sign was again changed to the current KBAI, first programmed as an easy listening format then flipped to oldies. 930 AM first began broadcasting in 1958 as KENY, a daytime radio station. The call letters were changed to KBFW in 1968 and they remained the same until the sale of the station in 1999. KBFW aired a country music format for 30 years.

On August 1, 2017, KBAI changed their format from progressive talk to classic hits, branded as "98.9 K-Bay" (the FM frequency is for FM translator K255DC Bellingham).

References

External links
FCC History Cards for KBAI

BAI
Classic hits radio stations in the United States
Radio stations established in 1999
1999 establishments in Washington (state)